is a yaoi manga by Temari Matsumoto. The manga is one volume with three different one-shot stories and couples. The first is about a teacher and student relationship, the second a toymaker and an android, and the third a school nurse and a student. The manga was licensed in the United States by BLU, the Boys Love branch of TokyoPop, in October 2007.

Plot

Manga

|}

Reception
Carlo Santos, writing for Anime News Network enjoyed the "moments of comedy" and the drama in Asahi's backstory, but found the sex scenes superfluous and repetitive. Leroy Douresseaux writing for Comic Book Bin praised Matsumoto's art, saying it "captures the yearning and longing of young love with ease and the explicit scenes with a modicum of decorum", recommending it for readers who are looking for something between "non-graphic" stories and "explicit" stories. Ariadne Roberts, writing for Mania Entertainment, described it as "a little cheesy fluff", saying that she felt that the "explicit content" sticker on the front was unwarranted.

References

External links

Manga anthologies
2003 manga
Tokyopop titles
Yaoi anime and manga